Rob Havenstein (born May 13, 1992) is an American football offensive tackle for the Los Angeles Rams of the National Football League (NFL). He was drafted by the Rams in the second round of the 2015 NFL Draft. He played college football at Wisconsin.

College recruiting

Havenstein committed to the University of Wisconsin–Madison on October 21, 2009. He also held offers from Penn State, Maryland, Virginia, Wake Forest, and West Virginia.

College career
Havenstein played on Wisconsin's offensive line as a right tackle from 2010 through 2014. In his five years Havenstein played in 54 games and started in 42 of them. Havenstein was a redshirt freshman in 2010. He played in 12 games in 2011, started every game for his remaining three years. In 2013, he was named 2nd-Team All-Big Ten by the media. At the end of the 2014 season he was named consensus 1st-Team All-Big Ten and 1st-Team All-American by the AFCA. At the end of his fifth year he was the only Badgers player invited to play in the 2015 Senior Bowl.

Professional career

Havenstein was drafted by the St. Louis Rams in the second round (57th overall), in the 2015 NFL Draft. In his rookie season, Havenstein started 13 games at right tackle and didn't allow a sack all season. At the end of the season Havenstein was named to PFWA's All Rookie Team with Rams' teammate Todd Gurley.

On April 11, 2017, it was announced that Havenstein would be moved inside to guard after the signing of Andrew Whitworth, which would've moved left tackle Greg Robinson over to the right, Havenstein's previous position. However, after Robinson was traded to the Detroit Lions, Havenstein remained the Rams starting right tackle to start 2017.

On August 20, 2018, Havenstein signed a four-year contract extension with the Rams through the 2022 season. He started all 16 games in 2018 and helped Rams win 13 games and earned the second seed in the NFC. The Rams defeated the Dallas Cowboys in the Divisional Round and the New Orleans Saints in the NFC Championship Game to reach Super Bowl LIII, where they would lose to the New England Patriots by a score of 13-3.

In 2021, Havenstein won Super Bowl LVI when the Rams defeated the Cincinnati Bengals 23-20.

On September 8, 2022, Havenstein signed a three-year, $34.5 million contract extension with $24.1 million guaranteed.

References

External links
Wisconsin Badgers bio
 Los Angeles Rams bio

1992 births
Living people
American football offensive guards
American football offensive tackles
Los Angeles Rams players
People from Mount Airy, Maryland
Players of American football from Maryland
Sportspeople from the Baltimore metropolitan area
Sportspeople from the Washington metropolitan area
St. Louis Rams players
Wisconsin Badgers football players
Ed Block Courage Award recipients